Bedok station is a commonly used name for Bedok MRT station – a Singapore Mass Rapid Transit (MRT) station. 

Other stations that contain the name "Bedok" are:

Bedok Reservoir MRT station, an MRT station on the Downtown line (DTL), near Bedok Reservoir.
Bedok North MRT station, another MRT station on the DTL.
Sungei Bedok MRT station, a station under construction on the Thomson–East Coast line (TEL) and DTL.
Bedok South MRT station, another MRT station under construction on the TEL.

See also
 Bedok